Ōhinerau / Mount Hobson (also known as Ōhinerangi and Remuwera) is a 143 m high volcanic cone and Tūpuna Maunga (ancestral mountain) in the Auckland volcanic field in Auckland, New Zealand.

Geography

Located in the Remuera suburb, to the east of the Newmarket commercial suburb, it has been extensively modified by human use, first by Māori for use as a pā and later by use as quarry and pasture land before finally having a water reservoir installed in its cone to supply the surrounding area. An additional, partially buried, water reservoir was built on the low southern side of the mountain in 1955. English oaks and pohutukawa are the most common trees on the hill.

History

Ōhinerau is named after Hinerau, a goddess of whirlwinds. Mount Hobson is named after Captain William Hobson. 
Remuwera was originally the name of a pa site on the hill that was also utilised for kumara and food gardens. The name Remuwera means the burnt edge of a flax garment.

A water reservoir was constructed on the northwestern side of Ōhinerau / Mount Hobson in 1935, damaging the terracing of the pā.

In the 2014 Treaty of Waitangi settlement between the Crown and the Ngā Mana Whenua o Tāmaki Makaurau collective of 13 Auckland iwi and hapu (also known as the Tāmaki Collective), ownership of the 14 Tūpuna Maunga of Tāmaki Makaurau / Auckland, was vested to the collective, including the volcano officially named Ōhinerau / Mount Hobson. The legislation specified that the land be held in trust "for the common benefit of Ngā Mana Whenua o Tāmaki Makaurau and the other people of Auckland". The Tūpuna Maunga o Tāmaki Makaurau Authority or Tūpuna Maunga Authority (TMA) is the co-governance organisation established to administer the 14 Tūpuna Maunga. Auckland Council manages the Tūpuna Maunga under the direction of the TMA.

Gallery

References

Volcanoes of Auckland: A Field Guide. Hayward, B.W.; Auckland University Press, 2019, 335 pp. .

External links
Photographs of Ōhinerau held in Auckland Libraries' heritage collections.

Auckland volcanic field
Hobson